Rudolf Molleker (born 26 October 2000) is a German tennis player. Molleker achieved a career high ATP singles ranking of World No. 146 on 29 July 2019 and a doubles ranking of World No. 376 on 21 March 2022.

Personal Information 
He was born in Sieverodonetsk in Ukraine to Roman and Tanja Molleker and moved to Oranienburg in Germany when he was three years old. He is of Russian–German descent.

He trains at Patrick Mouratoglou Academy in Sophia Antipolis (France) since 2018.

Tennis career

2017: ATP debut
Molleker made his ATP main draw debut at the German Open after defeating Casper Ruud and Leonardo Mayer, who later won the tournament as a lucky loser, in the qualifying rounds.

2018: First Challenger title & ATP and top-10 wins
Molleker won his first ATP Challenger Tour title as a wildcard at the Heilbronner Neckarcup, defeating Jiří Veselý in the final.

He won his first match at ATP-level at the Stuttgart Open, defeating compatriot Jan-Lennard Struff in the first round.

At the German Open he beat former world No. 3 David Ferrer in the first round.

2019: Grand Slam and top 150 debut

Molleker made his Grand Slam debut at the Australian Open, battling through three qualifying rounds before falling to world number 16 Diego Schwartzman in four sets, 1-6 3-6 6-4 0-6. 

At the French Open, he performed a similar feat, twice coming back from a set down to qualify for the main draw. He again lost in four sets in the first round, this time to Alexander Bublik 5-7 7-6 1-6 6-7.

Singles performance timeline

Current through the 2022 ATP Tour.

ATP Challenger and ITF Futures/World Tennis Tour finals

Singles: 9 (4-5)

Doubles: 1 (1–0)

Junior Grand Slam finals

Doubles: 1 (1 runner-up)

References

External links

 (in German)

2000 births
Living people
German male tennis players
People from Sievierodonetsk
People from Oranienburg
Russian people of German descent